Praso (Pras in local dialect) was a comune (municipality) in Trentino in the northern Italian region Trentino-Alto Adige/Südtirol, located about  southwest of Trento. It was merged with Daone and Bersone on January 1, 2015, to form a new municipality, Valdaone.

Praso borders the following municipalities: Daone, Roncone, Lardaro, Bersone and Pieve di Bono.

Demographic evolution

References

External links
 Homepage of the city

Cities and towns in Trentino-Alto Adige/Südtirol
Valdaone